Sir Robert Barclay Pearson (20 November 1871 – 12 February 1954) was a Scottish first-class cricketer, lawyer and stockbroker.

The son of Andrew Pearson, he was born in November 1871 at Laurencekirk, Kincardineshire. He was educated at Loretto School, before going up to Brasenose College, Oxford. While studying at Oxford, he made a single appearance in first-class cricket for Oxford University against Essex at Leyton in 1894. Batting twice in the match, Pearson was dismissed for 44 runs in the Oxford first innings by Charles Kortright, while in their second innings he was dismissed for 4 runs by the same bowler. He also bowled 21 wicketless overs across the match, conceding 35 runs. A talented sportsman, Pearson also played golf for Oxford in the 1892 and 1894 University Golf Match, in addition to playing rugby union for Oxford University RFC. He was a member of the Brasenose College Boat Club, rowing twice for them in the Head of the River contest. 

After graduating from Oxford, Pearson became a lawyer and was called to the Faculty of Advocates in Scotland in 1891. He later changed profession to become a stockbroker, which he did for 34 years. He was from 1938 to 1947 the chairman of the London Stock Exchange and was knighted in the 1944 New Year Honours. Pearson died at Marylebone in February 1954. Both his brother, Alexander, and son-in-law, Henry Foley, both played first-class cricket.

References

External links

1871 births
1954 deaths
People from Kincardine and Mearns
People educated at Loretto School, Musselburgh
Alumni of Brasenose College, Oxford
Scottish cricketers
Oxford University cricketers
Oxford University RFC players
Scottish lawyers
Members of the Faculty of Advocates
Scottish stockbrokers
Knights Bachelor